Fowzia Karimi is an Afghan-American author and illustrator who won the Rona Jaffe Foundation Writers' Award in 2011.

Early life and education 
Karimi was born in Kabul and relocated to the United States in 1980.

She has a masters in fine arts degree from Mills College at Northeastern University, in California.

Career 
Karimi won the Rona Jaffe Foundation Writers' Award in 2011. She illustrated Micheline Aharonian Marcom's 2017 book The Brick House. She illustrated the Zsuzsanna Ozsváth and Frederick Turner's translation of Goethe's Faust, published by Deep Vellum Books, in 2020. 

Karimi is the author of the illustrated book Above us the Milky Way: An Illuminated Alphabet, published by Deep Vellum, in 2020). The book was Karimi's first, is autobiographical, and incorporates family photographs and watercolour paintings. The book follows the stories of five sisters, who are born in Afghanistan and relocate to the United States. It was described by D Magazine as "gorgeous". It was re-released in audiobook format in 2021. The book inspired the 2022 exhibit Above Us the Milky Way in Void Gallery, Belfast.

She was a Neustadt International Prize for Literature jury member in 2022.

Personal life 

Karimi lives in Denton, Texas.

References 

Year of birth missing (living people)
Living people
People from Kabul
21st-century American women writers
Afghan emigrants to the United States
Rona Jaffe Foundation Writers' Award winners
Mills College alumni
People from Denton, Texas